James Lynn was a member of the Wisconsin State Assembly.

Biography
Lynn was born on October 12, 1916, in Milwaukee, Wisconsin. He attended Miami High School in Miami, Florida. During World War II, Lynn served in the United States Army. He was a member of the Knights of Columbus. He died on June 13, 2008.

Political career
Lynn was elected to the Assembly in 1968. He was a Democrat.

References

Politicians from Milwaukee
Politicians from Miami
Democratic Party members of the Wisconsin State Assembly
Military personnel from Wisconsin
United States Army soldiers
United States Army personnel of World War II
1916 births
2008 deaths
20th-century American politicians